Mariah Angelique Pérez (born August 7, 1999), known professionally as Mariah Angeliq, is an American singer.

Early life 
Angeliq was born Mariah Angelique Pérez in Miami, Florida, to a Cuban father and Puerto Rican mother. She was named after Mariah Carey. Her first language was Spanish, but she quickly learned English when she was enrolled in school in New Jersey.

Career 
Mariah Angeliq began writing music at the age of 16, and ran away from her home to follow her music career. She crossed paths with the reggaeton producer Nely who guided the artist and introduced Spanish music to her repertoire. She signed with Universal Music Latino in 2018. She released her first single "Blah" on June 28, 2018. On July 31, 2020, Angeliq released her first EP, Normal. Angeliq released a single with J Álvarez and Marie Monti titled "Billete" on March 5, 2021. She was a guest artist on Karol G's 2021 album KG0516, singing in the song "El Makinon". Puerto Rican rapper Ivy Queen is Angeliq’s musical idol.

Personal life 
Angeliq was reported to be dating actor Max Ehrich in November 2020. As of May 2021, she is currently dating actor and musician Roshon Fegan.

Discography 
 Normal (2020)
 La Tóxica (2021)

Awards and nominations

References

External links 

 
 
 

1999 births
Living people
Musicians from Miami
21st-century American women musicians
American people of Cuban descent
American people of Puerto Rican descent
American reggaeton musicians
Latin trap musicians
Songwriters from Florida
Spanish-language singers of the United States
Hispanic and Latino American musicians
Universal Music Latino artists
Women in Latin music